Niccola Ricciolini (Rome 1687-Rome 1772) was an Italian painter of the Baroque period. He was born at Rome and was a pupil of Pietro da Cortona. He competed against Marcantonio Franceschini with cartoons for the mosaic decoration of the Vatican. His designs led to the mosaics of Crucifixion of St. Peter (in mosaic) and a painting of Descent from the Cross.

References

1637 births
Year of death unknown
17th-century Italian painters
Italian male painters
Italian Baroque painters